Ski mountaineering (abbreviated to skimo) is a skiing discipline that involves climbing mountains either on skis or carrying them, depending on the steepness of the ascent, and then descending on skis. There are two major categories of equipment used, free-heel Telemark skis and skis based on Alpine skis, where the heel is free for ascents, but is fixed during descent. The discipline may be practiced recreationally or as a competitive sport.

Competitive ski mountaineering is typically a timed racing event that follows an established trail through challenging winter alpine terrain while passing through a series of checkpoints. Racers climb and descend under their own power using backcountry skiing equipment and techniques. More generally, ski mountaineering is an activity that variously combines ski touring, Telemark, backcountry skiing, and mountaineering.

History

Military patrol was an official event at the 1924 Winter Olympics, followed by demonstration events at the 1928 Winter Olympics, in 1936 and in 1948. Military patrol is considered to be a predecessor of the biathlon.

From 1992 to 2009, the  Comité International du Ski-Alpinisme de Compétition (CISAC), founded by France, Italy, Slovakia, Andorra and Switzerland, sanctioned the European Championship. Then the CISAC merged with the International Council for Ski Mountaineering Competitions in 1999, which in 2008 became the International Ski Mountaineering Federation (ISMF).

Outside Europe, international championships started with the  2007 South American Ski Mountaineering Championship  and the 2007 Asian Championship of Ski Mountaineering. The 2012 North American Ski Mountaineering Championship was the first edition of a North American Championship of Ski Mountaineering, sanctioned by the United States Ski Mountaineering Association.

In July 2021, the International Olympic Committee announced that Ski Mountaineering had been added as a new sport at the 2026 Winter Olympics in Milan Cortina, following a successful debut of the sport at the 2020 Winter Youth Olympics.

In October 2021, the Italian committee announced that SkiMo has been assigned to Bormio.

Competition
International competition is sanctioned by the International Ski Mountaineering Federation, while national bodies sanction national competitions, for example the United States Ski Mountaineering Association (USSMA), Ski Mountaineering Competition Canada (SMCC), and the Schweizer Alpen Club (Switzerland).

Three important races are the Italian Mezzalama Trophy, the Swiss Patrouille des Glaciers, and the French Pierra Menta.

Equipment
 Bindings: Should be reliable, light, and durable.
 Boots: Should be light and flexible.
 Skis: Width: 60-90mm to balance performance and weight. Skinnier skis lack performance in softer snow but are lighter while wider skis lack performance in firmer snow and are heavier. Lightweight skis make ascent easier. Length depends on a person’s height but going shorter than your normal length will be lighter and will be easier on steep terrain.
Ski skins: Attached to bottoms of skis, used for walking up slopes.
Rope: Are not always used in ski mountaineering, but if the approach to the summit or drop-in is treacherous, having a rope can help mitigate risk. When choosing a rope, you need to make sure it is a proper climbing rope, paracord and ropes found in gas stations are not suitable. Some popular climbing rope companies are Sterling, Mammut and Black Diamond.
Crampons: Are used to help walk and climb on hard packed snow and ice. They usually have 10 or 12 spikes and are secured to your boot using three different methods. The first method is strap-on crampons which you use by stepping into a basket and then securing with webbing and these fit with any type of boot. The second is hybrid or semi-automatic crampons. These use the welt on the back of your boot along with a basket in the front to hold onto your boot, and also use webbing to help secure them; these are made to work with a certain type of boot. The final type of crampon is an automatic or step-in crampon. These use both the back and front welt on your boot with webbing to secure to your boot. These types of crampons are the most secure, but also the most specialized crampon and need specific boots to have them work. 
Touring Bindings: Lightweight alpine touring or telemark bindings. For AT, the pin style toes are the lightest and tour the best.
Avalanche search and rescue equipment: Beacon (transceiver) - digital transceiver, Probe - at least 2 meters in length, Shovel - any snow shovel works but collapsible shovels are more lightweight and packable, Snow kit- used to help examine snow and snow quality.
Ice Axe: Used to assist safety in steep snow and ice. No longer than 60cm, 50-55cm is preferred.

Safety

Avalanche Education: Is education in how to safely travel in avalanche terrain and how to rescue others in case of an avalanche. Knowing how to identify and react in avalanche conditions is vital to being safe while ski mountaineering. Most areas with backcountry skiing and ski mountaineering have organizations who teach these courses. Two popular ones are AIARE and AAA. 

Wilderness medicine: When recreating in the outdoors it’s crucial to have medical skills and equipment with you. The importance of medical skills is even more pertinent when you’re deep in the backcountry. There are multiple companies who teach wilderness specific medical skills, the main few being NOLS and SOLO. They offer certifications ranging from Wildernesses First Aid to Wilderness EMT. With these skills you should also be carrying a first aid kit with all the necessities for the location and terrain you’ll be in.

See also 
Ski touring

References

 
Mountaineering
Snow sports
Types of Mountaineering